Kristopher Heppner (born January 18, 1977) is a former American football placekicker in the National Football League for the Seattle Seahawks and Washington Redskins.  He played college football at the University of Montana.

References

1977 births
Living people
Sportspeople from Great Falls, Montana
American football placekickers
Washington Redskins players
Seattle Seahawks players
Montana Grizzlies football players